The Spirit of Eternal Repose is a 1898–1899 sculpture of a sprite by French artist Auguste Rodin.

Houston
The Museum of Fine Arts, Houston's Lillie and Hugh Roy Cullen Sculpture Garden has a bronze sculpture. The Houston Press called the work "curious, since the ankles are crossed as they might be when a person is relaxing, but the tilted angle of the torso is precarious and the muscular arms are very active indeed. It is enigmatic and wonderful." It is one of three Rodin sculptures in the garden; the other two are Cybele (1890/1904) and The Walking Man (1877–1878). Spirit of Eternal Repose is on long-term loan from Iris Cantor and the Cantor Foundation on behalf of B. Gerald Cantor.

See also
 1899 in art
 List of public art in Houston
 List of sculptures by Auguste Rodin

References

External links
 

1899 establishments in Texas
1899 sculptures
Bronze sculptures in Texas
Lillie and Hugh Roy Cullen Sculpture Garden
Sculptures by Auguste Rodin
Sculptures of mythology
Statues in Houston
Works by French people
Fairies and sprites in popular culture